Petar Stojanović (born 7 October 1995) is a Slovenian professional footballer who plays as a right-back for Serie A side Empoli. He also represents the Slovenia national team.

Club career

Stojanović started playing football at the local football club Arne Tabor, before joining Slovan and later Interblock youth selections, where he remained until 2011, when he was acquired by Maribor. After his transfer to Maribor, Joc Pečečnik, the owner of Interblock, accused Zlatko Zahovič, the director of football at Maribor, of going behind his back and stealing one of the biggest Slovenian talents of his age.

At first Stojanović played as a goalkeeper but he then switched to the position of an offensive midfielder. When he transferred to Maribor youth selections he was regarded as one of the most promising young midfielders in the country, however, Maribor's coaches and staff saw a much bigger potential for Stojanović on the position of right-back. During his first year in Maribor he mostly played for the under-17 team. However, he got his chance to play for the main squad in the second part of the 2011–12 season and made his first appearance in the Slovenian top division, 1. SNL, on 25 March 2012. At the time of his debut, he was 16 years, five months and 18 days old and set a new club record as the youngest player to appear in the top division.

On 5 January 2016, he signed a five-year contract with Dinamo Zagreb, reportedly for a transfer fee of around €2 million plus add-ons.

On 20 July 2021, Stojanović joined Italian club Empoli on loan with a conditional obligation to buy. The conditions were fulfilled and Empoli purchased the rights on 17 June 2022.

International career
Stojanović was a member of the Slovenian under-17 team and appeared with the squad at the 2012 UEFA European Under-17 Championship, where he scored one goal. He made his senior national team debut versus Colombia on 18 November 2014. At the time he was 19 years, one month and 11 days old and became the youngest debutant in the national team, surpassing the previous record set by Rene Mihelič seven years earlier.

On 1 September 2021, he scored his first goal for the national team in the 2022 FIFA World Cup qualifying match against Slovakia, which ended in a 1–1 draw.

International goals
Scores and results list Slovenia's goal tally first, score column indicates score after each Stojanović goal.

Honours
Maribor
Slovenian PrvaLiga: 2011–12, 2012–13, 2013–14, 2014–15
Slovenian Cup: 2011–12, 2012–13
Slovenian Supercup: 2012, 2014

Dinamo Zagreb
Prva HNL: 2015–16, 2017–18, 2018–19, 2019–20, 2020–21
Croatian Cup: 2015–16, 2017–18, 2020–21
Croatian Supercup: 2019

References

External links
 NZS profile 
 

1995 births
Living people
Slovenian people of Serbian descent
Footballers from Ljubljana
Slovenian footballers
Slovenia youth international footballers
Slovenia under-21 international footballers
Slovenia international footballers
Association football midfielders
Association football fullbacks
NK Maribor players
GNK Dinamo Zagreb players
GNK Dinamo Zagreb II players
Empoli F.C. players
Slovenian PrvaLiga players
Croatian Football League players
First Football League (Croatia) players
Serie A players
Slovenian expatriate footballers
Expatriate footballers in Croatia
Expatriate footballers in Italy
Slovenian expatriate sportspeople in Croatia
Slovenian expatriate sportspeople in Italy